Kalča is a large shopping center in the City of Niš. The Kalča dominates the area and lies within Niš's downtown core. Today's Niš is reflected in these glass surfaces connecting the old town and the new Niš which is to come.

Features
There are nearly five hundred shops, many galleries, in-doors squares, passages, drives and stairs, all of them forming a modern ensemble. The glass facade is supported by pillars.

External links
 Niš website

Economy of Niš